On 30 March 1979,  Airey Neave, British Shadow Secretary of State for Northern Ireland, was assassinated by the Irish National Liberation Army with a bomb fixed under his car. The bomb detonated in the car park of the Palace of Westminster in London and mortally wounded Neave, who died shortly after being admitted to hospital.

Background
The Irish National Liberation Army (INLA), and its political wing the Irish Republican Socialist Party, was formed at a meeting in a Dublin hotel in December 1974. In 1975 it began carrying out a paramilitary campaign in Northern Ireland on British Government facilities and officials with the strategic objective of removing Northern Ireland  from the United Kingdom, using the front names of the "People's Liberation Army", and the "Armagh People's Republican Army".

Through the 1970s Neave, an influential Conservative Member of Parliament, had been advocating within British political circles for an abandonment of the British Government's strategy of a containment of Irish paramilitary violence in Northern Ireland against the British State, and for the adoption of strategy of waging a military offensive against it, seeking its martial defeat. This brought him to the attention of both the Provisional Irish Republican Army and the INLA as a potential threat to their organisations and activities. A member of INLA's leadership later stated:

He (Neave) was coming in on the heels of Mason to settle the Northern problem, and made Mason look like a lamb. He wanted to bring in more Special Air Service, and take the war to the enemy.

After the Labour Government's defeat in the House of Commons on a vote of no confidence on 28 March 1979, a general election was called in the United Kingdom, and with the Conservatives expected to win the election, Neave, as the party's Shadow Secretary of State for Northern Ireland, was set to become the new Secretary of State for Northern Ireland, which would place him in a position of governmental executive authority to bring his military strategy for the province into fruition.

Attack
A political source in Westminster hostile to Neave's statements on the security situation in Northern Ireland is believed 
to have passed on information to the INLA which gave it the means to carry out the assassination attack upon him within the precincts of the Palace of Westminster. The information it had received gave it a means of access to the House of Commons' car park, and INLA decided to use a bomb with a mercury-tilt switch detonator which would explode when the device was at a particular angle, i.e. when the vehicle was on the House of Commons' car park ramp, as it lacked information on Neave's movements with the car to allow the effective use of a time bomb device.

On Friday 30 March 1979 two INLA paramilitaries gained entry to the House of Commons' underground car park posing as workmen, carrying the bomb in a tool box. Once inside they identified Neave's car, and fixed a  explosive device with a mercury tilt detonator on to the floor panel under the driver's seat.

Neave left the House of Commons a few minutes before 3 p.m. As he drove up the underground car park's exit ramp the angle tilted the bomb's mercury switch and it exploded, the blast knocking Neave unconscious, severing his legs and trapping him in the mangled wreckage of the vehicle. Neave was cut free from the wreckage by the emergency services, and rushed to Westminster Hospital by ambulance, dying there a few minutes after arrival, not having regained consciousness.

Reactions
The INLA issued a statement regarding the attack in the August 1979 edition of its publication The Starry Plough:

Margaret Thatcher was due to broadcast to the nation that evening, but cancelled her plans due to her grief at Neave's death. The House of Commons decided to resume its business less than an hour after the tragedy, with Labour Chief Whip Michael Cocks and Conservative Norman St John-Stevas taking  the view that "legislation should not be baulked by murdering thugs."

Neave's death came just two days after the vote of no confidence which brought down Callaghan's government and a month before the 1979 general election, which saw a Conservative victory and Thatcher come to power as Prime Minister. Neave's wife Diana, whom he married on 29 December 1942, was subsequently elevated to the House of Lords as Baroness Airey of Abingdon.

Neave's biographer Paul Routledge met a member of the Irish Republican Socialist Party (the political wing of INLA) who was involved in the killing of Neave and who told Routledge that Neave "would have been very successful at that job [Northern Ireland Secretary]. He would have brought the armed struggle to its knees".

As a result of Neave's assassination the INLA was declared illegal across the whole of the United Kingdom on 2 July 1979.

Neave's body was buried in the graveyard of St. Margaret's Church at Hinton Waldrist, in Oxfordshire.

See also
Brighton bombing
Downing Street mortar attack
List of attacks on legislatures

Sources 
Jack Holland, Henry McDonald, INLA – Deadly Divisions'''The Lost Revolution: The Story of the Official IRA and the Workers' Party, Brian Hanley and Scott Millar, 
CAIN project 
Coogan, Tim Pat, The IRA'', Fontana Books, 
The Starry Plough – IRSP newspaper

References

Irish National Liberation Army actions
1979 murders in the United Kingdom
1979 in London
1970s murders in London
Crime in Westminster
Explosions in London
March 1979 events in the United Kingdom
1979 in British politics
1970s in the City of Westminster
Attacks on legislatures
Palace of Westminster
Improvised explosive device bombings in London
1979 United Kingdom general election
Attacks on British politicians
Assassinations in the United Kingdom